Anjali Jathar is an Indian actress and model who acted in several Hindi films.

Biography
Before coming to Bollywood Jathar was seen in Liril soap advertisement in 1991. She made her debut in Bollywood in 1994 with Madhosh. In 1995 she was seen in Aazmayish, Gundaraj and Trimurti. She was seen Shastra, Vishwasghaat and Bhishma in 1996. Her film Dhaal was released in 1997. Her last film Khote Sikkey was released in 1998.

Jathar married Kaushik Paul. They have a son whose name is Riaan. Initially, they settled in San Francisco. Later they moved to Raleigh where she runs a dance academy called "Anjali Jathar Bollywood Dance Academy".

Filmography

References

External links
 

Living people
Indian film actresses
Actresses in Hindi cinema
Indian female models
Year of birth missing (living people)